Diego Hidalgo (born 18 April 1993) is an Ecuadorian tennis player.

Hidalgo has a career high ATP singles ranking of 358 achieved on 3 February 2020. He also has a career high ATP doubles ranking of 70 achieved on 19 September 2022. Hidalgo has won 8 ATP Challengers and 16 ITF doubles titles.

Hidalgo represents Ecuador at the Davis Cup where he has a W/L record of 4–6.

College Career
Hidalgo played college tennis at the University of Florida between 2013 and 2016. He won the SEC Player of the Year Award in 2016.

Future and Challenger finals

Singles: 4 (2–2)

Doubles: 50 (24–26)

References

External links
 
 
 

1993 births
Living people
Ecuadorian male tennis players
Sportspeople from Guayaquil
Florida Gators men's tennis players
South American Games gold medalists for Ecuador
South American Games medalists in tennis
Competitors at the 2018 South American Games
Competitors at the 2010 South American Games
21st-century Ecuadorian people